Two spots in the Baseball at the 2004 Summer Olympics were available to baseball teams of the Pan American Baseball Confederation. To decide which teams would qualify, a tournament was held in 2003 in Panama, from October 30 to November 10. The tournament was won by Cuba, with Canada also qualifying for the Olympics.

Notably, the United States team did not qualify, after losing to Mexico in quarterfinals. This elicited shock in the American media as the USA was the previous gold medal winner, and was the first country to play baseball and is the country where baseball has the largest following. The major reason for defeat was the scheduling of the tournament, which meant the Americans could not even use minor league players.

Withdrawals

Although the tournament was originally scheduled to include 13 teams, four withdrew before their first game: Venezuela, the Dominican Republic, Aruba and the Bahamas. As the Bahamas were a last-minute withdrawal, the tournament structure was left unbalanced, with one pool larger than the other.

Pool Play

Pool A

Pool B

Before it could be played it became irrelevant to the standings, and was therefore cancelled.

Elimination

References

Baseball America

2003 in baseball
2003 in Panamanian sport
October 2003 sports events in North America
November 2003 sports events in North America
International baseball competitions hosted by Panama
Baseball at the 2004 Summer Olympics
Americas Baseball